Events in the year 1971 in Germany.

Incumbents
President – Gustav Heinemann 
Chancellor – Willy Brandt

Events 	
27 February – Germany in the Eurovision Song Contest 1971
14 March – West Berlin state election, 1971
21 March – Rhineland-Palatinate state election, 1971
27 May – Dahlerau train disaster
6 June – We've had abortions! in magazine Stern
26 June-July 6 - 21st Berlin International Film Festival
3 September – Four Power Agreement on Berlin
14 November – East German general election, 1971
Date unknown 
University of Bremen is founded.
University of Kassel is founded.
Dalli, Dalli by Hans Rosenthal is first broadcast, on ZDF.

Births 
3 January – Tarek Al-Wazir, German politician
8 January – Mike Süsser, German chef and author
26 January
Hubert Aiwanger, German politician
Rick Kavanian, German actor, comedian and author
19 March – Nadja Auermann, German model
11 April – Oliver Riedel, German musician	
29 April – Anja Karliczek, German politician	
13 August
 Moritz Bleibtreu, German actor
 Heike Makatsch, German actress
23 July – Cornelia Pfohl, German archer
19 August – Guido Cantz, German television presenter
3 September – Mirja Boes, German comedian and actress
2 October – Xavier Naidoo, German singer
18 October – Jan Wagner, German writer
19 October –  David Wagner, German soccer player and manager
30 October – Fredi Bobic, German football player
10 November – Nina Kunzendorf, German actress
18 November – Ilka Bessin, German comedian
5 December – Karl-Theodor zu Guttenberg, German politician
30 December – Manuela Schmermund, German Paralympic sport shooter

Full date unknown 
Martin Klimas, photographer

Deaths
14 January – Heinrich Anacker, German author (born 1901)
25 January – Hermann Hoth, German general (born 1885)
25 April – Erich Engels, German screenwriter, producer and film director (born 1889)
11 May – Hans Carste, German composer and conductor (born 1909)
6 May – Helene Weigel, German actress (born 1900)
13 May – Hubert von Meyerinck, German actor (born 1896)
3 June – Heinz Hopf, German mathematician (born 1894)	
21 June – Ludwig Schmidseder, German composer (born 1904)
26 June – Johannes Frießner, German general (born 1892)
7 August – Günther Rittau, German film director (born 1893)
17 August – Wilhelm List, German field marshal (b. 1880)
1 November 
 Walther Kittel, Wehrmacht general (born 1887)
 Gertrud von Le Fort, German writer of novels, poems and essays (born 1876)
14 November – Paul Klinger, German actor (born 1907)
10 December – Gotthard Heinrici, German general (born 1886)	
11 December – Gustav Ehrhart, German chemist (born 1894)

References

 
Years of the 20th century in Germany
1970s in Germany
Germany
Germany